The Bergmann Simplex was a compact firearm produced in the early 1900s, utilizing innovations from the earlier Bergman Model 1896 pistol, as well as the Mars pistol.  It was chambered for the proprietary Bergmann-Simplex 8mm cartridge.

References

Shideler, Dan. 2008 Standard Catalog of Firearms.  Krause Publications, 2008.  .

External links

Semi-automatic pistols 1901–1909